Irénée is the French version of the name Irenaeus. It may refer to:

People 
Charles-Irénée Castel de Saint-Pierre (1658–1743), French writer and radical
Éleuthère Irénée du Pont (1771–1834), French-born Huguenot chemist and industrialist
Francis Irénée du Pont (1873–1942), American chemist, and manager at the E.I. du Pont de Nemours Company
Henri-Irénée Marrou (1904–1977), French historian
Irénée du Pont (1876–1963), U.S. businessman, former president of the DuPont company and head of the Du Pont trust
Irénée Pelletier (1939–1994), Canadian politician
Irénée Vautrin, Canadian politician
Irénée-Jules Bienaymé (1796–1878), French statistician

Locations
Irénée-Marie Ecological Reserve, an ecological reserve in Quebec, Canada
Saint-Irénée, Quebec, a parish municipality in the Capitale-Nationale region of Quebec, Canada